The Japan Nuclear Cycle Development Institute (JNC) was formed in October 1998 to develop advanced nuclear energy technology to complete the nuclear fuel cycle, particularly fast breeder reactors, advanced reprocessing, plutonium fuel fabrication and high-level radioactive waste management. It succeeded the Power Reactor and Nuclear Fuel Development Corporation (PNC). It merged with the Japan Atomic Energy Research Institute (JAERI) in October 2005, becoming the Japan Atomic Energy Agency (JAEA).

See also 
 Nuclear power in Japan

References 
 Official site on the JAEA site
 History of Japan Nuclear Cycle Development Institute

Nuclear technology organizations of Japan